Palej railway station is a railway station on the Western Railway network in the state of Gujarat, India. Palej railway station is 26 km far away from Bharuch railway station. Passenger, MEMU and few Express/Superfast trains halt at Palej railway station.

Nearby Stations 

Varediya is nearest railway station towards Mumbai, whereas Lakodra Dethan is nearest railway station towards Vadodara.

Major Trains 

Following Express/Superfast trains halt at Palej railway station in both direction:

 19033/34 Valsad - Ahmedabad Gujarat Queen Express
 12929/30 Valsad - Dahod Intercity Superfast Express
 19023/24 Mumbai Central - Firozpur Janata Express
 19215/16 Mumbai Central - Porbandar Saurashtra Express
 22929/30 Bhilad - Vadodara Superfast Express
 22953/54 Mumbai Central - Ahmedabad Gujarat Superfast Express
 19218 Jamnagar - Bandra Terminus Saurashtra Janata Express
 19115/16 Dadar - Bhuj Sayajinagari Express

References

See also
 Bharuch district

Railway stations in Bharuch district
Vadodara railway division